Bjørn Tore Hoem Nilsen (born 12 April 1991) is a Norwegian former professional cyclist, who rode professionally between 2011 and 2019.

Major results

2011
 3rd Ringerike GP
 6th Overall Czech Cycling Tour
2012
 3rd Overall Okolo Jižních Čech
2014
 1st Eresfjord GP
 2nd Time trial, National Road Championships
 7th Ringerike GP
 8th Overall Tour of Norway
 9th Hadeland GP
2015
 1st Stage 5 Tour de Normandie
 3rd Overall Tour Alsace
1st Stage 1
2016
 2nd Overall Ronde de l'Oise
 5th Ringerike GP
 7th Overall Tour des Fjords
 8th Druivenkoers Overijse
 9th Sundvolden GP
2017
 6th Overall Ronde de l'Oise
 7th Overall Arctic Race of Norway
2018
 3rd Overall Tour de Normandie
2019
 3rd Overall Ronde de l'Oise
 5th Overall International Tour of Rhodes
 8th Lillehammer GP

References

External links

1991 births
Living people
Norwegian male cyclists